Alexander Flores (born August 9, 1990) is an American professional boxer.

Professional career

Boxing career
On August 18, 2011 Flores took out the veteran Serhiy Karpenko by K.O. This bout was held at the Orange County Fairgrounds in Costa Mesa, California.

Triller Triad Combat
On November 27, 2021, Flores faced MMA fighter Matt Mitrione in a boxing vs MMA card promoted by Triller. Flores won the fight via unanimous decision.

Professional boxing record

References

External links

American boxers of Mexican descent
Boxers from California
Heavyweight boxers
1990 births
Living people
American male boxers